This list of tallest buildings in Scandinavia ranks skyscrapers in Denmark, Norway and Sweden that stand at least  tall, based on height to architectural top (i.e. heights measured from the level of the lowest, significant, open-air, pedestrian entrance to the top of the building, including spires).

Completed buildings

Buildings approved or under construction

References

External links 
 Emporis
 Structurae

Scandinavian architecture
Scandinavia
Tall